Nitidella is a genus of sea snails, marine gastropod mollusks in the family Columbellidae, the dove snails.

Species
Species within the genus Nitidella include:
 Nitidella nitida (Lamarck, 1822)
Synonyms
 
 Nitidella carinata (Hinds, 1844): synonym of Alia carinata (Hinds, 1844)
 Nitidella cribraria (Lamarck, 1822): synonym of Mitrella ocellata (Gmelin, 1791)
 Nitidella densilineata Carpenter, 1864: synonym of Mitrella densilineata (Carpenter, 1864) (original combination)
 Nitidella elegans Dall, 1871: synonym of Mitrella elegans (Dall, 1871) (original combination)
 Nitidella filosa Stearns, 1873: synonym of Aesopus stearnsii (Tryon, 1883) (invalid: junior secondary homonym of Aesopus filosus Angas, 1867; C. strearnsii is a replacement name)
 Nitidella gouldii Carpenter, 1857: synonym of Alia carinata (Hinds, 1844) (original combination)
 Nitidella guttata (G. B. Sowerby I, 1832): synonym of Mitrella guttata (G. B. Sowerby I, 1832) (incorrect generic combination)
 Nitidella hendersoni Dall, 1908: synonym of Rhombinella laevigata (Linnaeus, 1758) (junior synonym)
 Nitidella incerta Stearns, 1892: synonym of Falsuszafrona incerta (Stearns, 1892) (original combination)
 Nitidella laevigata (Linnaeus, 1758): synonym of Rhombinella laevigata (Linnaeus, 1758)
 Nitidella lutulenta Dall, 1919: synonym of Mitrella gausapata (A. Gould, 1850)
 Nitidella marmorata Swainson, 1840: synonym of Nitidella nitida (Lamarck, 1822)
 Nitidella millepunctata Carpenter, 1864: synonym of Mitrella millepunctata (Carpenter, 1864) (original combination)
 Nitidella ocellina F. Nordsieck, 1975: synonym of Mitrella broderipii (G. B. Sowerby I, 1844)

References

External links
 Swainson, W. (1840). A treatise on malacology or shells and shell-fish. London, Longman. viii + 419 pp.

Columbellidae
Monotypic gastropod genera